Quebec County  was an electoral district of the Legislative Assembly of the Parliament of the Province of Canada, in Canada East, surrounding Quebec City. It was created in 1841 and was based on the previous electoral district of the same name for the Legislative Assembly of Lower Canada.

Quebec County was represented by one member in the Legislative Assembly. It was abolished in 1867, upon the creation of Canada and the province of Quebec.

Boundaries 

Quebec County surrounded the municipality of Quebec, but also included some portions of the municipality.  The Governor General, Lord Sydenham, drew the boundaries of the Quebec City electoral district to exclude francophone Canadiens, strengthening the influence of voters of British extraction, an example of a linguistic and ethnic gerrymander.  He did so to win as much support as possible for the recent union of the two former provinces into the Province of Canada, and for his government. The excluded areas became part of Quebec County.

The Union Act, 1840 had merged the two provinces of Lower Canada and  Upper Canada into the Province of Canada, with a single Parliament.  The separate parliaments of Lower Canada and Upper Canada were abolished.Union Act, 1840, 3 & 4 Vict., c. 35, s. 2. The Union Act provided that the pre-existing electoral boundaries of Lower Canada and Upper Canada would continue to be used in the new Parliament, unless altered by the Union Act itself.

The Union Act did not directly amend the boundaries of the Quebec County electoral district, so the boundaries of the former Quebec County district continued to be the basis for the new electoral district.  Those boundaries had been set by a statute of Lower Canada in 1829:

While the boundaries of Quebec County were not directly affected by the Union Act, that Act gave the Governor General the power to draw the boundaries for the Quebec City electoral district.  Lord Sydenham did so by a proclamation issued just before the first  general election, which started in March, 1841.  His overall goal in drawing the boundaries was to ensure that supporters of the creation of the new Province of Canada and of his government would be elected. The boundaries did not follow the normal municipal boundaries, rather being drawn along certain streets and geographic features.  This new electoral district was designed to exclude as many francophone Canadien voters as possible, and to include as many voters of British background as possible, since they generally supported the union and Lord Sydenham's government. It was an example of an ethnic and linguistic gerrymander.  The areas of the municipality of Quebec which were not included in the new electoral district of Quebec City instead were included in Quebec County.  The result was the effective disenfranchisement of Quebec francophone voters in the 1841 election.

Members of the Legislative Assembly 

Quebec County was represented by one member in the Legislative Assembly. The following were the members of the Legislative Assembly from Quebec County.

Abolition 

The district was abolished on July 1, 1867, when the British North America Act, 1867 came into force, creating Canada and splitting the Province of Canada into Quebec and Ontario.  It was succeeded by electoral districts of the same name in the House of Commons of Canada and the Legislative Assembly of Quebec.

References 

Electoral districts of Canada East